Matteo Di Giusto (born 18 August 2000) is a Swiss professional footballer who plays as a forward for Winterthur.

Club career
On 7 July 2022, Di Giusto signed a four-year contract with Winterthur.

References

2000 births
People from Wetzikon
Sportspeople from the canton of Zürich
Living people
Swiss men's footballers
Association football forwards
Switzerland youth international footballers
Switzerland under-21 international footballers
SC Freiburg players
FC Zürich players
FC Vaduz players
FC Winterthur players
Swiss Promotion League players
Swiss Super League players
Swiss Challenge League players
Swiss expatriate footballers
Swiss expatriate sportspeople in Germany
Expatriate footballers in Germany
Swiss expatriate sportspeople in Liechtenstein
Expatriate footballers in Liechtenstein